Tushinskaya is a station on the Tagansko-Krasnopresnenskaya Line of the Moscow Metro. It was designed by I.G. Petukhova and V.P. Kachurinets and opened on 30 December 1975. The station was built to a modified standard design, with grey-blue marble pillars and white marble walls with inlaid zigzag friezes. Tushinskaya is one of the Metro's busiest stations, serving about 111,000 passengers per day according to a 1999 study.

Tushinskaya is located adjacent to Tushinskaya railway station on the Rizhsky suburban railway line and Line D2 of Moscow Central Diameters.

External links
metro.ru
mymetro.ru
KartaMetro.info – Station location and exits on Moscow map (English/Russian)

Moscow Metro stations
Railway stations in Russia opened in 1975
Tagansko-Krasnopresnenskaya Line
Railway stations located underground in Russia